Usk was an ancient hundred of Monmouthshire.

It was situated in the centre of the county, bounded to the north by the hundreds of Abergavenny and Raglan; to the east and south by the hundred of Caldicot; and to the west by the hundred of Wentloog.

It contains the following ancient parishes:

Caerleon township
Gwehelog Fawr
Gwernesney
Kemeys
Kemeys Commander
Little Mill
Llanbadog
Llandegveth
Llangattock
Llangeview
Llangwm
Llangybi Fawr
Llanhennock
Llanllywel
Llanthewy Vach
Llantrissant Fawr
Llanvihangel Pont y Moile
Llanfrechfa
Panteg
Tintern
Tredunnock
Trostre
Usk

The administration of the area is now divided between the local authorities of Newport, Torfaen and Monmouthshire.

External links
Usk Hundred on a Vision of Britain

History of Monmouthshire
Usk